Thomas Edward Arth (born May 11, 1981) is an American football coach and former player.  He was head coach of the University of Akron. He was also the head football coach at John Carroll University from 2013 to 2016 and University of Tennessee Chattanooga from 2017–2018

Playing career
Arth attended Saint Ignatius High School in Cleveland. In 1998, he took the reins as the starting quarterback for the perennial national power and led the Wildcats to the Division I State Semi-Finals where they lost to defending National Champion and eventual State Champion Canton McKinley Bulldogs. Over the course of the 1998 season, Arth threw for over 2,100 yards and 24 touchdowns.

At John Carroll University, Arth started for four years at quarterback, and set 18 John Carroll football records. He earned unanimous All-American honors as a junior and senior. In 2002, he guided the Blue Streaks to a 12-2 record, an East Regional Championship, and a berth in the NCAA Division III National Semi-Finals for the first time in program history. Over the course of his career, Arth captured every major passing record at John Carroll, including passing yards (10,457), and touchdowns (89).

He spent time with the Indianapolis Colts (2003–2005) who allocated him to the Scottish Claymores (2004) and the Hamburg Sea Devils (2005) of NFL Europa. During his three seasons with the Colts, he served as a back-up to quarterback Peyton Manning.

He was signed by the Green Bay Packers in 2006 but was released prior to the start of training camp. Arth signed with the Toronto Argonauts of the Canadian Football League in February 2007. Arth later signed with the Grand Rapids Rampage of the Arena Football League.

Coaching career

John Carroll
On December 5, 2012, Arth was named the 17th head football coach at John Carroll.

On November 12, 2016, Arth's program earned their first outright Ohio Athletic Conference title since 1989 with a 31–28 victory over then-No.1 Mount Union.  On December 17, 2016, Arth was named D3football.com Coach of the Year for 2016, becoming the first Blue Streaks mentor in any sport to earn a national honor in 42 years.

Chattanooga
Arth was named the head coach of the University of Tennessee at Chattanooga on December 19, 2016.

Akron
On December 14, 2018, Arth was named the 28th head football coach at the University of Akron. Akron fired Arth on November 4, 2021, toward the end of his third season. His overall record at Akron was 3–24.

Los Angeles Chargers
Arth was hired by the Los Angeles Chargers as a pass game specialist on February 9, 2022.

Personal life
Arth and his wife, Lauren, a 2003 graduate of John Carroll, have five children: Caroline, Thomas, Kathleen, Patrick and Elizabeth.

Arth founded the Cleveland Passing Academy in June 2008.

Head coaching record

References

External links
 Akron profile
 Chattanooga profile
 John Carroll profile
 Just Sports Stats

1981 births
Living people
American football quarterbacks
Akron Zips football coaches
Chattanooga Mocs football coaches
Georgia Force players
Grand Rapids Rampage players
Green Bay Packers players
Hamburg Sea Devils players
Indianapolis Colts players
John Carroll Blue Streaks football coaches
John Carroll Blue Streaks football players
Scottish Claymores players
Toronto Argonauts players
People from Westlake, Ohio
Saint Ignatius High School (Cleveland) alumni
Coaches of American football from Ohio
Players of American football from Ohio
Los Angeles Chargers coaches